Cortez High School, at 121 E. First St. in Cortez, Colorado, was built in 1909 and operated as a school until 1968.

It was listed on the National Register of Historic Places in 2016.

It was Cortez' old high school, most recently Calkins Jr. High School.  It became a junior high school in 1946 when Montezuma-Cortez High School opened.

Its National Register nomination document was not available during government shutdown in January 2019.

References

		

National Register of Historic Places in Montezuma County, Colorado
School buildings on the National Register of Historic Places in Colorado
School buildings completed in 1909
High schools in Colorado
1909 establishments in Colorado